Rear Admiral Robert G. Pedre is a senior Royal Navy officer and current Commander United Kingdom Strike Force.

Naval career
Pedre joined the Royal Navy on 3 November 1998. Ocean was decommissioned in the presence of Queen Elizabeth II on 27 March 2018.

He went on to be Commander Littoral Strike Group in May 2020, and, with promotion to rear admiral, Commander United Kingdom Strike Force in September 2022.

References

Royal Navy rear admirals
Year of birth missing (living people)
Living people